Bifascioides sindonia is a moth in the family Cosmopterigidae. It is found on Aldabra in the Seychelles.

This species has a wingspan of 7–8 mm. The forewings are dark purplish-fuscous with a rather broad ochreous-white fascia near the base.

References

Moths described in 1911
Chrysopeleiinae
Moths of Africa